That Peter Kay Thing is a series of six spoof documentaries shown on Channel 4 in 2000. It was written by Peter Kay, Dave Spikey, Neil Fitzmaurice and Gareth Hughes, and was directed by Andrew Gillman. The series was narrated by Andrew Sachs. Set in and around Bolton, each episode functions as a self-contained documentary following a different set of characters, many of them played by Kay. The pilot episode, "The Services", was shown in 1998 as an episode of Comedy Lab, a series which showcases pilots of experimental comedy shows. Many of the characters went on to appear in the successful spin-off series Phoenix Nights.

Episode list

Characters

Brian Potter (Kay) – Notoriously selfish social secretary of the working men's club The Neptune. He lost the use of his legs when his former club flooded. It is suggested that he can actually walk, as at the end of the episode he is seen to stand whilst remonstrating with a group of firemen.
Max and Paddy (Kay and Paddy McGuinness) – Two inept bouncers at the Neptune.
Jerry St. Clair (Dave Spikey) – Part-time builder and compère at the Neptune Club, and a previous winner of Talent Trek.
Les Alanos – The Neptune's house band, Les (Toby Foster) and Alan (Steve Edge). Les originally worked with Alan's father before he left to form the tribute band Right Said Frank.
Paul le Roy (Kay) – A local disc jockey for the radio station Chorley FM. He is obsessed with the music of the 1980s. He sports a mullet and has a long-suffering wife.
Keith Lard (Kay) – An overly zealous local fire safety inspector who, it is alleged, interferes with dogs.
Patrick O'Neil (Kay) – A cheeky employee at the Apollo Bingo Hall, who along with his friend "Sparky" (Alex Lowe), causes havoc in the Apollo.
Tom Dale (Kay) – A Liverpudlian bingo caller known for his bizarre pre-show preparations and his catchphrase "Let's tickle those balls".
Rose and Theresa (Kay and Beatrice Kelley) – Two middle aged bingo fans who assume anyone who wins is sleeping with Tom Dale.
Mr Softytop, aka Robert Edge (Kay) – A third generation ice-cream man who hates children.

Signor Whippy (Kay) – An ice-cream man and Mr Softytop's rival.
Darren Bramwell (Kristian Tiffany) – A college student who works for Mr. Softy Top on weekends.
Matthew Kelly (Kay) – An aspiring Irish actor who is unhappily stuck in several part-time jobs.
Johnny Utah, aka Craig (Kay) – A surly Wild West obsessive, who works as a coach driver.
Duncan Beach (Daniel Kitson) – A St. John Ambulance volunteer who is devoted to his job, but treated with contempt by those he treats.
Chris Choi (Neil Fitzmaurice) – One half of the security group Live Sec.
Shaun Ballen (Kay) – The other half of the security group Live Sec.
Leonard de Tomkinson (Kay) – An elderly, kindly local eccentric. Due to angina he is unable to work, but has a paper round and is, therefore, Britain's oldest paperboy.
Marc Park (Kay) – An aspiring pop star, and former greengrocer, who looks like Mick Hucknall. He has a dog called Lady.
Cheryl Avenue (Claire Rhodes) – An aspiring pop star, and former member of Park Avenue, she is the former long suffering partner of Marc Park and mother to his child. She later gained a pop career in her own right while also making her ex look bad much to Marc's chagrin. 
Pearl Hardman (Kay) – A would-be career woman who manages a Bolton service station.
Alan McClarty (Kay) – A Scottish mechanic who has worked for the RAC before his wife left him and he had a nervous breakdown. He now runs his own breakdown company, "ARC".

Reception
That Peter Kay Thing won the Best New TV Comedy award at the British Comedy Awards.

Legacy
A number of the characters in That Peter Kay Thing, including Brian Potter, Max and Paddy, and Jerry St Clair went on to become central characters in the highly successful spinoff series Phoenix Nights and Max and Paddy's Road to Nowhere.

In Episode 1, it was claimed Brian joined the Neptune club as a new member of staff, however this is inaccurate as his former club before, the Aquarius, as seen in Max and Paddy's Road to Nowhere, still features all the Neptune's staff and committee.

References

External links
That Peter Kay Thing at Channel 4

2000 British television series debuts
2000 British television series endings
2000s British comedy television series
Channel 4 comedy
English-language television shows
Television shows set in Lancashire
British mockumentary television series